The 1898 VFL season was the second season of the Victorian Football League (VFL), the highest level senior Australian rules football competition in Victoria. The season featured eight clubs, ran from 14 May until 24 September, and comprised a 14-game home-and-away season followed by a finals series featuring all eight clubs.

The premiership was won by the Fitzroy Football Club for the first time, after it defeated  by 15 points in the inaugural 1898 VFL Grand Final.

Premiership season
In 1898, the VFL competition consisted of eight teams of 20 on-the-field players each, with no "reserves" (although any of the 20 players who had left the playing field for any reason could later resume their place on the field at any time during the match).

Each team played each other twice in a home-and-away season of 14 rounds.

Once the 14 round home-and-away season had finished, the 1898 VFL Premiers were determined by the specific format and conventions of the 1898 VFL Premiership System.

Round 1

Round 2

Round 3

Round 4

Round 5

Round 6

Round 7

Round 8

Round 9

Round 10

Round 11

Round 12

Round 13

Round 14

Win/Loss table

Bold – Home game
X – Bye
Opponent for round listed above margin

Ladder

Ladder progression

Finals

Sectional Round 1

Sectional Round 2

Sectional Round 3

Section A Ladder

Section B Ladder

Bracket

Semi-final

Grand Final

Awards
 The 1898 VFL  Premiership team was Fitzroy.
 The VFL's leading goalkicker was Archie Smith of Collingwood with 31 goals.
 The wooden spoon went to St Kilda.

Notable events
 On 21 May 1898, playing against St Kilda Football Club, Geelong's Firth McCallum eluded 12 opponents to score a goal.
 On 12 August 1898, the League issues a directive that all field umpires are banned from playing, after umpire Samuel Hood plays for Footscray against North Melbourne in a VFA match on the 6th of August.
 A VFL representative team played two matches against a combined Ballarat Football League team. The VFL won their home match, and lost their away match.
 Essendon player Corrie Gardner, who also played for Melbourne Football Club from 1900 to 1903 and in 1905, and who represented Australia in the hurdles and the long jump at the 1904 Summer Olympics at St. Louis, Missouri in the USA, won the Australian Amateur Athletics hurdle championship in 1898.
 At the end of the home-and away season, Essendon had a VFL record percentage of 202.2%.
 1898 was the first VFL season that the premiership had been decided in a "challenge" match.
 Two sets of brothers played for Fitzroy in the 1898 "Grand Final Match": Bill Dalton and Jack Dalton; and Jim Grace and Mick Grace.

See also
 1898 VFL Grand Final
 1898 VFL finals series

References
 Maplestone, M., Flying Higher: History of the Essendon Football Club 1872–1996, Essendon Football Club, (Melbourne), 1996. 
 Rogers, S. & Brown, A., Every Game Ever Played: VFL/AFL Results 1897–1997 (Sixth Edition), Viking Books, (Ringwood), 1998. 
 Ross, J. (ed), 100 Years of Australian Football 1897–1996: The Complete Story of the AFL, All the Big Stories, All the Great Pictures, All the Champions, Every AFL Season Reported, Viking, (Ringwood), 1996. 
 Atkinson, G., The Complete Book of AFL Finals (2002 Edition), The Five Mile Press, (Scoresby), 2002.

External links
 1898 Season - AFL Tables
 "1898" (Brisbane Lions Website, 1 May, 2006)

Australian Football League seasons
VFL season